Spain won 22 gold medals, 10 silver medals and 12 bronze medals.

These were the first Games where Spain sent participants who had cerebral palsy.

In 1984, Spain had competitors in archery, wheelchair basketball, swimming, weightlifting, table tennis and athletics.

Background 

The 1984 Games were held in Stoke Mandeville, England and in New York, United States.   The Games did not use the same venues as the Summer Olympics. Competitors with spinal cord injuries, amputations, cerebral palsy and vision impairments were eligible to compete in these Games.

At the 1984 Games, Great Britain won the most medals among all Les Autres events.  They claimed 55.  Spain was second with 38 and the United States was third with 26.

Archery 

One of Spain's silver medals came in archery.  It was won by an athlete with a physical disability.

Athletics

Three of Spain's gold medals, one silver medal and three bronze medals came in athletics.  Four of the medals were won by athletes with visual impairments.  Three were won by athletes with physical disabilities.

Swimming 

Nineteen of Spain's gold medals, eight silver medals and nine bronze medals came in swimming.  All medals were won by athletes with physical disabilities.

References

Nations at the 1984 Summer Paralympics
1984
1984 in Spanish sport